Herman Diederik Johan van Schevichaven (14 October 1826 – 1918) who wrote as Jacob Larwood, was a Dutch non-fiction author.

Selected publications

Dutch
 Bijdragen tot eene geschiedenis der Bataven met kaarten, Leiden, 1875.
 Epigraphie der Bataafsche krijgslieden in de Romeinsche legers

English
 The History of Signboards, From the Earliest Times to the Present Day. John Camden Hotten, London, 1866. 
 The Book of Clerical Anecdotes: A gathering from many sources of the antiquities, humours, and eccentricities of "the cloth". J. C. Hotten, London, 1871.
 The Story of the London Parks. J. C. Hotten, London, 1872.
 Theatrical Anecdotes, or Fun and Curiosities of the Play, the Playhouse, and the Players. Chatto and Windus, London, 1882.
 Forensic Anecdotes or Humour and Curiosities of the Law and of the Men of Law. Chatto & Windus, London, 1882.

References

External links 

Larwood, Jacob, 1827-1918 | The Online Books Page

1826 births
1918 deaths
Dutch non-fiction writers
People from Nijmegen
Dutch emigrants to the United Kingdom